Shaki Waterfall is a waterfall in Armenia, with a height of 18 m. It is located in Syunik Province. 

The Shaki Waterfall is situated 6 km from the town of Sisian. On the left side of the river Vorotan's gorge, basalt lava flows have solidified to form a ledge 18 meters high from which the waterfall cascades down.

Gallery

See also 
Geography of Armenia

References

External links 

Landforms of Armenia
Waterfalls of Europe
Waterfalls of Asia
Geography of Syunik Province
Tourist attractions in Syunik Province